PT Indosat Tbk, trading as Indosat Ooredoo Hutchison (abbreviated as IOH), is a telecommunications provider in Indonesia which is owned by Ooredoo Hutchison Asia, a joint venture between Ooredoo and Hutchison Asia Telecom Group (a part of CK Hutchison Holdings) since 2022. The company offers wireless services for mobile phones, and to a lesser extent, broadband internet lines for homes. Indosat operates their wireless services under two brands: IM3 and Three (3). These brands differ by their payment model (pre-paid vs. post-paid) as well as pricing. Indosat also provides other services such as IDD, fixed telecommunications, and multimedia.

In February 2013, Qtel, a majority stakeholder in Indosat, rebranded itself as Ooredoo. This was followed by a renaming of all their subsidiaries across multiple countries. As such, Indosat was renamed Indosat Ooredoo on November 19, 2015.

, Indosat had 58 million subscribers. This is a sharp decrease from 2017, where the number was reported as 110 million. The market share was 16.5%, making them the second largest mobile network operator in the country.

History

1967
Indosat was established as the first foreign investment company in Indonesia that provides international telecommunication services using an international satellite. It was owned by American conglomerate company ITT until 1980.

1980 

Indosat expanded into becoming the first international company that was acquired and 100% owned by the Indonesian Government.

1994–2003
Indosat acquired Satelindo and SLI through share majority. They also established PT Indosat Multimedia Mobile (IM3) to provide and operate a nationwide GPRS network, a first for the country. In 2003, Indosat merged with its 3 subsidiaries—Satelindo, IM3, and Bimagraha—and established itself as a mobile network operator.

2003–2009

Indosat was granted a 3G network license and introduced a 3.5G service in Jakarta and Surabaya. In 2009, Qtel bought 24.19% of series B shares from the public and became Indosat's majority shareholder with a 65% ownership. They were granted the use of additional 3G frequencies later that same year. Indosat also won the WiMAX bid from the government during this period.

2012–2020

In 2014, Indosat launched and commercialized a 4G service at 900 MHz, with a download speed of up to 42 Mbit/s. The service was first rolled out in the major cities, with planned expansions to rural areas. In November 2015, Indosat rebranded itself as Indosat Ooredoo. In 2016, Indosat teamed up with Swedish based music streaming service Spotify to become the first operator to offer Spotify music services in Indonesia.

2021–present

In January 2021, Indosat announced that it will exit the satellite business. In September 2021, Indosat has announced that the latter company would be merged with Hutchison Asia Telecom Group/Garibaldi Thohir's joint venture PT Hutchison 3 Indonesia (who operates 3-branded networks in Indonesia) to form Indosat Ooredoo Hutchison (IOH). The merger was closed on 4 January 2022.

Subsidiaries

Current
 Lintasarta is an Indonesian company serving as provider of data communication. The company is majority owned by Indosat Ooredoo, while the remaining shares are owned by several institutions such as foundations and cooperatives. The company provides various terrestrial solution services (Wireline, Wireless) and VSAT with multiple platforms such as Clear Channel, Frame Relay, and IP. It also provides dedicated internet service and acts as a Data Center.

Former
 PT Indosat Mega Media (Indosat-M2) is a company 100 percent owned by PT Indosat Tbk, a telecommunications service provider in Indonesia. IndosatM2 has been operational since 2000 in building and applying IP based services and products, internet, and multimedia in Indonesia.

Slogans

As Indosat
Sinyal Kuat Indosat (Indosat Strong Signal) (2002–2009)
Indosat, Kami Lebih Peduli (Indosat, We Care More) (1994–2002)
Indosat, Easier. Simpler. Better. (2002–2005)
Indosat, The Future is Here (2005–2006)
Punya Indosat (Owned by Indosat) (2006–2015)

As Indosat Ooredoo
Indosat Ooredoo, Mari Sambut Perubahan (Indosat Ooredoo, Let's Welcome The Change) (2015–2022)

As Indosat Ooredoo Hutchison (IOH)
Indosat Ooredoo Hutchison, Bersatu untuk Indonesia (Indosat Ooredoo Hutchison, United for Indonesia) (2022)
IOH, Empowering Indonesia (2022–present)

Shareholders 
Following are Indosat Ooredoo Hutchison shareholders (as of 4 January 2022):
 Ooredoo Hutchison Asia (65.6%), which jointly owned by Ooredoo and Hutchison Asia Telecom Group
 The Government of Indonesia (9.6%)
 Public, including PT Tiga Telekomunikasi Indonesia, which jointly owned by Garibaldi Thohir and Northstar Group (24.8%)

References

External links
 
 IM3 website
 Tri (3) Indonesia website
 Indosat HiFi website

Telecommunications companies of Indonesia
Mobile phone companies of Indonesia
Multinational companies
Companies based in Jakarta
Telecommunications companies established in 1967
Companies listed on the Indonesia Stock Exchange
Companies formerly listed on the New York Stock Exchange
Members of the Conexus Mobile Alliance
1994 initial public offerings
ITT Inc.
Ooredoo
CK Hutchison Holdings
3 (company)
Indonesian brands
Indonesian companies established in 1967